Christian Rudolph (born 14 January 1965 in Cologne) is a German carom billiards player and multiple world champion in three-cushion billiards. He is the son of carom billiards champion Ernst Rudolph.

Personal life 
His father Ernst, a 17-time German champion and two-time European Vice Champion, was an important German billiard players of the 1950s and 1960s. At the age of nine years Christian was practicing in the two father-operated billiard-halls in Cologne.

Rudolph practices three hours a day at the table and one hour at the gym. He ignored the typical entry into the game of carom billiards, starting with straight rail, and played three-cushion from the beginning on. Rudolph still lives (as of 2017) in his birthplace Cologne.

Achievements 
 UMB World Three-cushion Championship:  1996 •  1998
 Three-Cushion World Cup: Overall winner  1997 (UMB / CEB) • Single  1997/1, 1997/5
 World Championships for national teams:  1993, 1994, 1997, 2002 •  2001 2006 2013 •   1990, 1991, 1998, 1999, 2005, 2007, 2009, 2011
 CEB European Three-cushion Championship: Second 2013
 Coupe d'Europe:  1994, 1996, 1997
 German Champion (3-cushion, single):  1994, 1996, 1998, 1999, 2000, 2001, 2005, 2011 2013, 2014, 2015 •  1992, 2008, 2016 •  1989, 1990
 German Cup champions (3-cushion, team):  1988, 1989, 1992, 1994, 1996
 German Grand Prix : 
 Overall winner  1990, 1992
Single Winner  1990/3, 1990/5, 1991/2, 1991/6, 1992/2, 1992/6, 1993/4, 1994/1, 1994/5, 2008/1, 2008/4, 2012/3, 2010/5
 German Three-cushion Masters :  2013

References

1965 births
Living people
German carom billiards players
World champions in three-cushion billiards
World Cup champions in three-cushion billiards
Place of birth missing (living people)
Competitors at the 2005 World Games
Sportspeople from Cologne